Pontyclun (or Pont-y-clun) is a village and community located in the county borough of Rhondda Cynon Taf, Wales. Like the surrounding towns, it has seen a sharp increase in its population in the last ten years as people migrate south from the South Wales Valleys and west from the capital city of Cardiff.

Pontyclun translates from the Welsh language as 'bridge [over] the River Clun', the Clun being a tributary of the River Ely that runs through Pontyclun. A bridge crosses the Afon Clun just above its confluence with the Ely.

The village is served by Pontyclun railway station on the South Wales Main Line. It has its own local rugby club.

The village falls under the remit of Pontyclun Community Council, which represents the communities of Brynsadler, Castell y Mwnws, Groes-faen, Miskin, Mwyndy, Pontyclun, Talygarn, and Ynysddu

History
The influx of workers for the iron ore and coal mining industries, and the coming of the South Wales Railway in 1851, changed Pontyclun from a  farm with just four to five households into a burgeoning Victorian industrial town. The Coedcae Colliery (first listed in 1856) and the Bute iron ore mine (which opened in October 1852) caused the population growth. By 1871, the census returns record an influx of Cornish miners who had suffered from the collapse of the copper mining industry in Cornwall. By 1870 the industries of the area had been expanded by the coming of the Ely Tin Plate Works, The Pipe Works and The Steam Joinery Company.

Administration
The Community Council was formed in 1985 and consists of eleven elected Community Councillors who are all residents of the area. They act on behalf of local people to try and preserve the best aspects of the villages, while also encouraging and supporting developments that will benefit the whole community and ensure that it will continue to thrive. The Community Council monitors all local planning applications and, where appropriate, suggests amendments or submits written objections. Pontyclun

Electoral ward
Pont-y-clun was an electoral ward to Mid Glamorgan County Council electing one county councillor from 1989 and 1993 elections, subsequently (from 1995) becoming a ward to Rhondda Cynon Taf County Borough Council, electing two councillors.

Religion
Bethel Baptist Chapel was built circa 1876. Bethel relocated to Bethel Baptist Church Centre on Heol Miskin in 1993. Cwrt Bethel is on the site of the old chapel. St Paul's church, Pontyclun was erected in 1895 as a district church within the Anglican parish of Llantrisant. In 1924, the new parish of Pontyclun and Talygarn was constituted from the parish of Llantrisant. Bethel Baptist Church, Hope Presbyterian Church and St Paul's Church are still active places of worship.

Schools & education
The village is served by Y Pant School, a secondary school with about 1,150 pupils, situated in the village of Talbot Green. In 2000 it was ranked 49th in Wales in terms of its GCSE results (based on 5 GCSEs, grades A-C). Since then, exam results have improved dramatically and according to the latest inspection report from Estyn, the school now has a pass rate of 72% which means it is in equal 19th place in Wales, or in the top 10%. It is also the best performing secondary school in Rhondda Cynon Taf, just ahead of St. John the Baptist School (Aberdare). The village also houses Pontyclun Primary school which achieved above average results in all foundation subjects in the most recent Estyn reports.

Sport

Pontyclun has both a football and rugby union team. Pontyclun Football Club were formed in 1896 and joined the Football Association of Wales in 1922. Pontyclun Rugby Football Club (otherwise known as the Pontyclun Badgers), were formed in 1886 and joined the Welsh Rugby Union in 1887. Pontyclun has produced at least one Welsh international, Tommy Rees who later played rugby league for Great Britain, and Oldham. Pontyclun also has produced an International Footballer - Keith Pontin (Cardiff City and Wales). Pontyclun also has a Bowls Club established in 1932 as part of the Athletic Club in the heart of the village.

Pontyclun also has a number of other sports clubs including Pontyclun Flyers (Cycling) and Pontyclun Road Runners (Running)

Crown Brewery
The South Wales & Monmouth United Clubs Brewery Co. Ltd. purchased the small family brewery owned by D & T Davies in 1919. This Company had been formed to supply the expanding number of Workingmen's Clubs, which were having difficulties with supply of beer from the many local breweries throughout the area. The Sunday Closing (Wales) Act of 1881 had fuelled the expanding number of clubs that did not have to close on Sunday, as was the case with public houses. 
 
By 1936 the brewery was producing 500 barrels per week, which continued to increase to 900 in 1938. This growth was halted by the outbreak of the Second World War in 1939 but when the war ended in 1945 the growth took off again. By 1954 the old brewery had been replaced by a completely new building that was big enough to produce the 1,200 barrels per week that the clubs demanded at that time. In 1984 Bob Smith was head brewer for the company and was only the fifth in the 65 years the company had been trading. In 1988 Crown merged with Wales' oldest brewery, Buckley's of Llanelly to form the Crown Buckley Brewery. In the spring of 1999, after 80 years of trading, the brewery closed following the takeover of the company by Cardiff based Brains Brewery.

External links
Pontyclun
Pontyclun
Pontyclun RFC
Bethel Baptist Church
Pontyclun History
Pontyclun Community Council
Old photos of Pontyclun
www.geograph.co.uk: photos of Pontyclun and surrounding area

References

 
Villages in Rhondda Cynon Taf
Communities in Rhondda Cynon Taf